The 1932 United States presidential election in South Dakota took place on November 8, 1932, as part of the 1932 United States presidential election. Voters chose four representatives, or electors, to the Electoral College, who voted for president and vice president.

South Dakota was won by Governor Franklin D. Roosevelt (D–New York), running with Speaker John Nance Garner, with 63.62 percent of the popular vote, against incumbent President Herbert Hoover (R–California), running with Vice President Charles Curtis, with 34.40 percent of the popular vote. 

As a result of his win in the state, Roosevelt became only the second Democratic presidential candidate to win South Dakota as well as the first since William Jennings Bryan in 1896.

This is the only occasion since South Dakota’s statehood when Campbell County, Hutchinson County, Sully County and Turner County have voted for a Democratic Presidential candidate, and the last occasion when Butte County and McPherson County have done so.

This election constitutes the most raw votes a Democrat has ever received in South Dakota. Along with North Dakota in the same year, this is the longest standing such record. It is one of just six states where a candidate other than Joe Biden in 2020 or Barack Obama in either of his runs holds the record for most raw votes ever received by a Democrat. The others are Rhode Island and West Virginia (Lyndon Johnson), Louisiana and Arkansas (Bill Clinton), and Oklahoma (Jimmy Carter).

Results

Results by county

See also
 United States presidential elections in South Dakota

Notes

References

South Dakota
1932
1932 South Dakota elections